Emmanuelle Coubat (born 1 April 1970) is a female former international table tennis player from France.

Table tennis career
She won a bronze medal for France at the 1991 World Table Tennis Championships in the Corbillon Cup (women's team event) with Sandrine Derrien, Xiaoming Drechou and Agnès Le Lannic.

She represented France at two Olympic Games in 1992 and 1996.

She also won a European Table Tennis Championships bronze medal and is four times singles champion of France in 1988, 1992, 1993 and 1996. In addition she won seven national doubles titles (six with Sylvie Plaisant), and four national mixed doubles with Olivier Marmurek.

See also
 List of World Table Tennis Championships medalists

References

1970 births
Living people
French female table tennis players
World Table Tennis Championships medalists
Olympic table tennis players of France
Table tennis players at the 1992 Summer Olympics
Table tennis players at the 1996 Summer Olympics
20th-century French women
21st-century French women